"65 Roses" is a 2001 song about cystic fibrosis written and performed by Australian singer Lee J Collier. The song is about a young girl who cannot pronounce "cystic fibrosis", instead calling it "sixty-five roses", only to learn the correct pronunciation when she grows older. The song won Collier the New Songwriters Award at the 2002 Tamworth Songwriters Awards.

Australian band Wolverines recorded the song the same year, with a few lyric changes, and released it as a single. Due to promotional complications between LJ Hooker (a sponsor of Cystic Fibrosis Australia) and the Australian Recording Industry Association (ARIA), the song peaked at only number 23 on the ARIA Singles Chart in July. A re-release in 2002 failed to make a significant impact in Australia, but in New Zealand, the single reached number one in May, becoming the band's only hit outside Australia.

Background and lyrics
"65 Roses" was written by Australian singer Lee J Collier in 2001. The song is about a young girl who is told by her parents that her older sister has cystic fibrosis. However, she misunderstands the condition's name and calls it "sixty-five roses" instead. This leads her to believe that flowers are causing her sister's fatigue and breathlessness, which baffles her. When she gets older, she finally begins to understand her sister has "cystic fibrosis", not "sixty-five roses", and why her parents were teary-eyed when they told her about the condition. Realizing the truth, the girl wishes her sister had roses instead.

Collier's original version was praised by many organisations and she received numerous awards, including the Tamworth Songwriters Association Award for Songwriter of the Year and Contemporary Country Song of the Year, in 2002. The song was later included on her album Don't Call Me Madam or I'll Send You An Invoice!, and she has performed the song at many cystic fibrosis fundraisers.

Wolverines version

Shortly after Collier released "65 Roses", John Clinton, vocalist and drummer of Australian country rock band Wolverines, decided to record a cover of the song due to his sister (and most of his family) suffering from cystic fibrosis. A few of the lyrics were changed, and the narrator of the song is now a boy. It too was released in 2001, on 18 June, with Clinton intending to raise money for cystic fibrosis research. In 2002 the song appeared on their album Wolverines & Roses.

Charting controversy
Although the cover became a big hit in Australia, it quickly encountered a few problems that prevented it from entering the upper reaches of Australia's official music chart, the ARIA Singles Chart. Clinton believed one of the reasons the song underperformed was because someone from a major record label complained about the song and the band to ARIA, although he was unsure of who did it.

The second reason "65 Roses" stalled inside the top 30 was due to a technicality in ARIA's chart methodology. The song received support from LJ Hooker, an Australian real estate group that also sponsors Cystic Fibrosis Australia. Due to the group's heavy involvement in the single's promotion, including sending memos to its other major franchises encouraging them to buy the single, ARIA treated this as insider trading, so any sales involving these organisations did not register on the 
ARIA Singles Chart, greatly upsetting Clinton and Cystic Fibrosis Australia's chief executive at the time, Terry Stewart. As a result of these neglected sales, "65 Roses" reached no higher than number 23 on the ARIA Singles Chart and spent only three weeks in the top 50.

Chart performance
The Wolverines' version of "65 Roses" debuted on the ARIA Charts at number 38 on 15 July 2001. The next week, the single rose 13 places to number 25, then reached its peak of number 23 the following week. However, as a possible result of the song's disregarded sales following the involvement of LJ Hooker, it dropped out of the chart on 5 August.

"65 Roses" was re-released in 2002, but it did not replicate the success of the original release in Australia, stalling at number 95 in February. In New Zealand, however, the single debuted at number one on the RIANZ Singles Chart on the week of 26 May, becoming the only Wolverines song to experience success outside Australia. It dropped to number 40 after peaking, then left the chart altogether. The song has received a Gold certification in both Australia and New Zealand.

Awards and nominations

|-
| rowspan="2" | 2002
| APRA Music Awards of 2002
| Most Performed Country Work
| 
|-
| Golden Guitar Awards of 2002
| Vocal Group or Duo of the Year
| 
|}

Charts and certifications

Weekly charts

Certifications

See also
Cystic fibrosis
List of number-one singles from the 2000s (New Zealand)

References

2001 songs
2001 singles
2002 singles
Australian country music songs
Songs about diseases and disorders
Songs about flowers
Capitol Records singles
EMI Records singles
Number-one singles in New Zealand
Works about cystic fibrosis